Abraham Aguilar (died 1794) was a British slave trader of Portuguese descent.

Aguilar was the only known Jewish slave factor in Kingston, Jamaica in the 1760s and 1770s, and he operated with other non-Jewish merchants in the firm of Coppells & Aguilar.

In 1789, he had a large detached house built at 24, West Side, Wimbledon Common, London, now known as The Kier.

When Aguilar's will was proved in 1794, he also owned property in London's Devonshire Square.

References

1794 deaths
18th-century English Jews
British slave traders
People from Wimbledon, London
English people of Portuguese-Jewish descent
18th-century Sephardi Jews